The trickle-up effect in the fashion field, also known as bubble-up pattern, is an innovative fashion theory first described by Paul Blumberg in the 1970s. This effect describes when new trends are found on the streets, showing how innovation flows from the lower class to upper class. It is in contrast with classical theories of fashion consumption, such as those of Georg Simmel and Thorstein Veblen, who theorize that the upper classes are the ones who dictate the fashion flow.

Origins of the trickle-down and trickle-up effects 
The trickle-down effect can be seen as the antithesis of the trickle-up effect. Although the trickle-down effect itself has only first appeared in the 1950s, the concept can be traced back to sociologist Georg Simmel and economist Thorstein Veblen. 
Trickle-down theory describes the inability of the lower social classes to develop fashion style of their own, leaving only the upper social classes to influence the fashion trend. Lower social classes are therefore left to imitate the fashion trend of the rich. 
In contrast to this, the  trickle-up effect describes an upward diffusion in which fashion styles from lower classes are adopted by the upper classes.

In opposition to the downward diffusion of fashion in latter years, we now encounter a phenomenon in which trends are more likely to be defined by the lower social strata . 
It was first described by Paul Blumberg during the 1970s in the United States: "[…] there has been in the last decade more percolating up from the bottom than trickling down from the top". Blumberg elaborates on this by stating that a variety of standards in fashion have been set by the déclassé and anti-class youth by using new styles, like long hair or a shabby chic, to not only tease the status symbols of higher classes but also spreading their styles into the fashion elite.

History through iconic cases

T-shirt 
The T-shirt, from the Middle Age to the early 19th century, had traditionally been considered as a piece of undergarment worn by sailors and blue-collar workers.

American actors Marlon Brando and James Dean helped shift the perception of the T-shirt, thanks to their appearance with the garment in popular movies. Brando and Dean helped redefine the T-shirt as legitimate outerwear and a deliberately rebellious fashion statement. The T-shirt appears in collections of both low and high-end brands, due to its versatility and the ease of imposing messages on it. A significant example of the t-shirt as messenger is the "anti-nuclear" T-shirt worn by designer Katharine Hamnett during a meeting with Margaret Thatcher or the piece "We all should be feminists" presented at Dior Fashion show in 2016.

Punk style 

Punks originated in the 1970s in the UK. Punk style started as a youth movement, in which the concept of "anti-fashion" was the key due to its origin in the lower classes. The first designer that spread this concept was Vivienne Westwood (considered "The Mother of Punk"), who opened a popular shop in London loved by celebrities and music stars of the time, such as the band Sex Pistols. Studded chokers, Dr Martens boots, chains and ripped jeans were the main features of the punk aesthetic. In 1977, this style started to be widely appreciated thanks to Zandra Rhodes designs, that added punk elements on elegant gowns: punk chic was born.

1970s and hippie fashion 
Born in the 1970s, the hippie style shifted from being an exclusive of lower and middle-class alternative youths to a widespread trend. From 2012 it made a huge comeback with looks made of flow-y-tops and skirts paired with knit shrugs. An example is Ralph Lauren’s spring collection (2011), which presents skirts with higher waist with the flow-y details towards the bottom. Moreover, hippie fashion, today also known as boho style, has also entered the popular imaginary as a trendy style thanks to popular figures like the actress Vanessa Hudgens, and themed events like The Coachella Valley Music and Arts Festival.

1980s and yuppie fashion 
Another important example of trickling-up in fashion is given by the revival of some iconic 1980s yuppie-inspired pieces of clothing like kitten heels, pastel colors, white commuter sneakers, power shoulder and high waisted pants with skinny belts by major fashion houses like Ralph Lauren, Tory Burch, Dr. Martens Boots and Tibi.

1990s and grunge influence 

Grunge fashion, characterized by oversized plaid flannel shirts, ripped jeans, combat boots, choker necklaces, and dark colored sheer tights, was a consequence of the huge success of bands such as Nirvana and Soundgarden. The idea of wearing clothes that seemed inexpensive and already worn was re-proposed in the 1993 Spring collections by avant-garde designers like Marc Jacobs, Christian Francis Roth and Anna Sui causing disarray in the fashion industry.

Military-inspired clothing 
Military-inspired clothing first appeared after World War II when lower and middle-class young people started to buy pea jackets and khaki pants as a sign of independence and protest against war. The trend survived until today since Chanel, Balmain, Marc Jacobs, Celine, Hermes, Lanvin, D&G and Burberry are some of the fashion houses that from 2010 propose military-inspired collections enriched with garments and jewelry. Combat boots, leather studded bracelets, and double-breasted jackets with rows of buttons are pieces that can be easily found both in luxury runways and in fast fashion chains

Role of Digital culture in trickle-up Fashion 
While influencing the fashion industry was out of reach for an ordinary consumer, social media started to change this former two-dimensional, one-sided industry. Due to the fact that social media networks formed platforms, which gave new possibilities to people with a special interest in fashion, influencers meanwhile play an important role in agencies’ and brands’ marketing strategies. Those social media fashion icons can be seen as an example for the trickle-up effect in fashion, as they were able  to form trends and influence fashion by only using the opportunity of presenting their own fashion taste on free platforms like Instagram or Facebook. An example for that is the Italian influencer Chiara Ferragni, who started with a small blog and is meanwhile not just seen as a fashion icon but also runs her own fashion business

Key factors of Social Media in trickle-up fashion 
Fashion is currently a two-way route due to web digital space. Before the digital era people had to go physically at Fashion Weeks but after digitalization people can participate through social media platforms to latest trends. Digital based life has carried diversity to the industry. Anyone can present themselves and follow those who relate to them in body or lifestyle. By using hashtags users are able to find virtually whatever trend they want and they do not have to wait for the new edition of Vogue. For example, #winterscarves #millennials #californiawinter #winterfashion.

From streetwear to the mainstream 
Veblen's trickle-down theory was related to the wanting of the society in 1800 to climb the social ladder; after the advent and the spread of social media, people do not have to be on the top of the social scale anymore to be noticed and to express their style: from
wherever they are, they can create trends. Designers now have online stores as main sales channels; they maintain an active social
media presence. Digital space is now a key place for brands to showcase collections, develop personalities and to develop relationships with customers. The history of trickle-up fashion and influence of Digital world brought evolution in the fashion industry and many decades to follow. As particular styles began to draw attention on the streets and digital space trends, top designers decided to incorporate them into
their collections: an example of this, is 2016 Gucci collection, created in collaboration with a famous graffiti artist, or retailers as Urban Outfitters, where streetstyle garments are sold at high-end prices

See also 
 Trickle-down effect  
 Fashion industry 
 Vivienne Westwood
 Influencers

References 

Fashion terminology